Capitol Heights may refer to some locations in the United States:

Capitol Heights, Maryland, a town adjacent to Washington, DC
Capitol Heights (Washington Metro), a transit station
Capitol Heights (Harrisburg), a neighborhood in Harrisburg, Pennsylvania